Mulroney: The Opera is a satirical Canadian film about former prime minister Brian Mulroney. The film, budgeted at $3.8 million (CAD), is directed by Larry Weinstein, who previously worked on nine operas with Dan Redican and Alexina Louie.

Cast
Brian Mulroney: Rick Miller
Mila Mulroney: Stephanie Mills
Jean Chrétien: Colin Mochrie
Pierre Trudeau: Wayne Best
Ed Broadbent: Ted Dykstra
Ronald Reagan: Joe Matheson
Nancy Reagan: Janet-Laine Green 
John Allen Fraser: Dan Lett 
Robert Coates: Seán Cullen
Kim Campbell: Joanne Boland
John Turner: Geordie Johnson 
Col. Robert R. McCormick: Michael Murphy 
Fake Historian: Dan Redican
Debate Moderator: Patrick McKenna
Young Brian: Eamon Stocks

Reception
The film received mixed reviews.  Torontoist deemed it the "most recognizably Canadian comedy ever".  Greg Quill of the Toronto Star panned the production as "a fiasco, a flame-out for sure, but an epic failure". The Globe and Mail praised the film for having "overwhelming ambition, hyperbole, pathos, satire and politics with clever writing, skilled acting, great voices and compelling music".

References

External links
 
 
 Mulroney: The Opera at Telefilm Canada

2011 films
Canadian musical comedy films
English-language Canadian films
Brian Mulroney
Musical films based on actual events
Operas set in Canada
2010s musical comedy films
2011 comedy films
Canadian political comedy films
2010s English-language films
2010s Canadian films